Miles Davis' Greatest Hits is a compilation album by Miles Davis originally released in 1969 and re-released in 1997 on CD with different recordings of tracks 3, 4 and 8.

Track listing 1997 CD reissue
 "Seven Steps to Heaven" (Victor Feldman, Miles Davis)  – 6:26  Available on Seven Steps to Heaven 
 "All Blues" [live] (Davis) – 8:54  Available on My Funny Valentine 
 "Someday My Prince Will Come" (Larry Morey, Frank E. Churchill) – 9:11  Available on Someday My Prince Will Come 
 "Walkin'" [live] [edited] (Richard Carpenter) – 13:11  Unedited version available on In Person Friday Night at the Blackhawk 
 "My Funny Valentine" [live] (Richard Rodgers, Lorenz Hart) – 5:10  Available on My Funny Valentine 
 "E.S.P." (Wayne Shorter) – 5:32  Available on E.S.P. 
 "'Round Midnight" (Thelonious Monk, Cootie Williams, Bernie Hanighen) – 5:58  Available on 'Round About Midnight 
 "So What" (Davis) – 9:23  Available on Kind of Blue

Personnel & Recording date
Note: tracks 3, 4 and 8 of the original 1969 edition have different personnel and recording dates.

 "Seven Steps to Heaven"  Miles Davis, trumpet; George Coleman, tenor sax; Herbie Hancock, piano; Ron Carter, bass; Tony Williams, drums.  Recorded 5/14/63 at Columbia 30th Street Studio, New York, NY.
 "All Blues"  Miles Davis, trumpet; George Coleman, tenor sax; Herbie Hancock, piano; Ron Carter, bass; Tony Williams, drums.  Recorded 2/12/64 at the Philharmonic Hall at Lincoln Center, New York, NY.
 "Someday My Prince Will Come"  Miles Davis, trumpet; John Coltrane, tenor sax; Hank Mobley, tenor sax; Wynton Kelly, piano; Paul Chambers, bass; Jimmy Cobb, drums.  Recorded 3/20/61 at Columbia 30th Street Studio, New York NY.
 "Walkin'"  Miles Davis, trumpet; Hank Mobley, tenor sax; Herbie Hancock, piano; Ron Carter, bass; Tony Williams, drums.  Recorded 4/21/61 at the Black Hawk Club, San Francisco, CA.
 "My Funny Valentine"  Miles Davis, trumpet; George Coleman, tenor sax; Herbie Hancock, piano; Ron Carter, bass; Tony Williams, drums.  Recorded 2/12/64 at the Philharmonic Hall at Lincoln Center, New York, NY.
 "E.S.P."  Miles Davis, trumpet; Wayne Shorter, tenor sax; Herbie Hancock, piano; Ron Carter, bass; Tony Williams, drums.  Recorded 1/20/65 at Columbia Studio, Los Angeles, CA.
 "'Round Midnight"  Miles Davis, trumpet; John Coltrane, tenor sax; Red Garland, piano; Paul Chambers, bass; Philly Joe Jones, drums.  Recorded 9/10/56 at Columbia 30th Street Studio, New York, NY.
 "So What"  Miles Davis, trumpet; John Coltrane, tenor sax; Cannonball Adderley, alto sax; Bill Evans, piano; Paul Chambers, bass; Jimmy Cobb, drums.  Recorded 3/2/1959 at Columbia 30th Street Studio, New York, NY.

Production 
Original Recordings Produced by Irving Townsend, George Avakian, Teo Macero
Reissue Produced by Nedra Olds-Neal
C 1997 Sony Music Entertainment Inc./Originally released 1969 Sony Music Entertainment Inc./"Columbia" is the exclusive trademark of Sony Music Entertainment Inc. / "Legacy" and L are trademark of Sony Music Entertainment Inc./Distribution Sony Music 01-065418-10

Notes 
 Miles Davis' Greatest Hits Amazon link

External links 

1969 greatest hits albums
Miles Davis compilation albums
Columbia Records compilation albums
Albums recorded at CBS 30th Street Studio
Albums produced by Teo Macero
Sony Records compilation albums